Xie Yiyu may refer to:

Nicholas Chia (born 1938), Singaporean Roman Catholic priest
Lyddia Cheah (born 1989), Malaysian badminton player